The Bragdon Formation is a geologic formation in California. It preserves fossils dating back to the Carboniferous period. Its sandstones may be rich in quartz, chert and sedimentary rock fragments, or volcanic rock fragments, or volcanic ash (tuff) containing abundant crystals. Gravelly, loamy brown soils of the Hugo series are commonly developed on Bragdon parent material in the Trinity Lake area.

See also

 List of fossiliferous stratigraphic units in California
 Paleontology in California

References

 

Carboniferous California